Boomerang, later Carroll's Boomerang, was an Irish Sport Horse who stood 16.2 hh (168 cm), ridden in show jumping competitions, most successfully by Eddie Macken. Boomerang was also ridden by Liz Edgar (Broome), Johan Heins and Paul Schockemöhle.

Boomerang was bred by Jimmy Murphy of Maifield, Grangemockler, County Tipperary, a well-known sportsman and local politician from Grangemockler, Co Tipperary. Jimmy and his wife Mai, a successful racehorse owner, sent their Irish Draught mare, Girl From The Brown Mountain, to Battleburn, owned by John Shine, Meenroe, Meelin, Co.Cork.  Jimmy and his family broke the horse, initially known as Battle Boy, and recognised his prodigious ability. They hunted him with the Kilmoganny Harriers and jumped him in novice classes on the Tipperary/Kilkenny/Waterford gymkhana circuit and then sent him to "finishing school" with Iris Kellett, the 1969 European showjumping champion, at her stables at Mespil Road in Dublin. There, the horse was first ridden by Eddie Macken, then a working pupil at Kellett's. He first jumped at the RDS Dublin Spring Show as a four-year-old in 1970. Two years later, Jimmy sold him to Ted and Liz Edgar's yard in Warwickshire, England. Liz Edgar jumped him with success. He was then sold on to Paul Schockemöhle, who took him to his stables in Mühlen, Germany and renamed him Boomerang.

Macken by this time had moved into the heartland of continental competition when he went to the Schockemöhle brothers Paul and Alwin in the Spring of 1975. A rich German owner, Dr. Herbert Schnapka, eased Macken's way by providing horses for him to ride in the Schockemöhle yard. Easter Parade, Macken's best horse at the time, broke his back in a freak accident on his way back from the cancelled spring meeting at Hickstead in 1975. By way of an interim replacement, Paul Schockemöhle said to Macken: ...take my speed horse Boomerang for the time being until you get something better.'

Over the period 1975–1979, Macken and Boomerang were to win or take second in a record-breaking 32 major Grand Prix's or Derby events across Europe and in the United States. Boomerang helped Macken top the World Computer Ratings in 1976, 1977, and 1978, while amassing £250,000 in prize money - record winnings at the time.(£911,000 in 2007 money)

In 1977 Dr Schnapka gave the outright gift of Boomerang to Eddie Macken.

In 1978 they traveled to Aachen for the world championship where Macken hoped to avenge his narrow defeat on Pele at Hickstead four years earlier. When they reached the final four, the omens were looking positive, but then disaster struck. In the final round Macken was obliged to jump a round on each of his competitors’ horses and on one, Pandur Z, he made a miscalculation and picked up a quarter of a time fault – “like Tiger Woods missing a three-foot putt” – and the slip cost him gold. “Boomerang deserved to be world champion,” Macken said. “Well, he was world champion because he was the best horse there. I wasn’t. I was the one who made the mistake.”

When he and Boomerang were at their peak Macken was barred from competing at the Olympic Games because he was a professional and had sponsorship. The 1979 European Championships, in Rotterdam again proved a disappointment. Boomerang did not knock a single fence in the first three rounds and helped Con Power on Rockbarton, Gerry Mullins on Ballinderry and John Roche on Maigh Cullin to a bronze medal behind Britain and Germany. Boomerang was in the individual lead and heading for gold when a judge made a late decision that he had hit the tape at the water jump, and he and Macken finished in fourth place.

In the fading weeks of that year and, as it turned out, the fading moments of his career, Boomerang and Macken made their first trip to Calgary, won the main class every day and took the du Maurier Classic Grand Prix in September. In October, the duo won their fourth Horse of the Year Grand Prix at Wembley. Lastly, at the second Dublin Indoor International in November, they won the main events on the Thursday and Friday, followed by third place in the Grand Prix. With a double clear, they were fourth in the Grand Prix at Olympia just before Christmas, and that was to be Boomerang's last major individual outing with Macken.

But he and Macken won four consecutive Hickstead Derbies from 1976 to 1979, and also the Hamburg equivalent in 1976. They, along with James Kernan on Condy, Paul Darragh on Heather Honey and Capt. Con Power on (Coolronan 1977, Castlepark 1978 and Rockbarton 1979), won the Aga Khan Trophy at the RDS Dublin (Ireland's Nations Cup) from 1977 to 1979.

In early 1980 Boomerang had to be retired because of a broken pedal bone. Then in May 1983, at 17 years of age, Boomerang had to be euthanized and was buried at Rafeehan Stud, Kells, County Meath. His grave is marked by four evergreen trees. They are symbols of four Hickstead Derby wins, four Championships at Wembley, four clear rounds in the final of the 1978 World Championships, and four years in a row without a fence down in the Aga Khan Trophy competition in Dublin. Ni bheidh a leithéid arís ann (Irish for "His like will not be seen again").

Major achievements 
1979
Horse of the Year Grand Prix, Wembley, London
Championship, Wembley, London
Spruce Meadows Grand Prix, Calgary, Canada
Team bronze at the European Championships, Rotterdam, Netherlands
Individual 4th, European Championships, Rotterdam, Netherlands
Nations Cup (Aga Khan Trophy), Dublin, Ireland
Nations Cup, Aachen, Germany
Hickstead Derby, Hickstead, England
Hickstead Derby Trial, Hickstead, England
1978
Health Trophy, Dublin Indoor International
Horse of the Year Grand Prix, Wembley, London
Hickstead Derby, Hickstead, England
Individual silver medal, World Show Jumping Championships, Aachen, Germany
2nd place, Dublin Grand Prix, Dublin, Ireland
Nations Cup (Aga Khan Trophy), Dublin, Ireland
Aachen Grand Prix, Aachen, Germany
Championship, Aachen, Germany
Rome Grand Prix, Rome, Italy
Championship, Rome, Italy
Hamburg Grand Prix, Hamburg, Germany
Nice Grand Prix, Nice, France
Gothenburg Grand Prix, Gothenburg, Sweden
1977
Brussels Grand Prix, Brussels, Belgium
Horse of the Year Grand Prix, Wembley, London
Nations Cup (Aga Khan Trophy), Dublin, Ireland
Hickstead Derby, Hickstead, England
La Baule Grand Prix, La Baule, France
2nd place, Nations Cup, La Baule, France
2nd place, Grand Prix, Rome, Italy
1976
Championship, Wembley, London
New York City Grand Prix, U.S.A
Helped Macken become Leading Rider in Washington.
Wins in Toronto gave Macken the overall award for the three shows on the North American circuit.
Hickstead Derby, Hickstead, England
Hamburg Derby, Hamburg, Germany - (8th 1975, 4th 1977, 6th 1978)
Professional Championship, Cardiff, Wales
2nd place, Grand Prix, Lucerne, Switzerland
2nd place, Nations Cup, Lucerne, Switzerland
1975
Horse of the Year Grand Prix, Wembley, London
Championship, Wembley, London
4 faults, Hickstead Derby, Hickstead, England
Hickstead Derby Trial, Hickstead, England
2nd place, Dublin Grand Prix, Dublin, Ireland
2nd place, Nations Cup (Aga Khan Trophy), Dublin, Ireland
St. Gallen Grand Prix,  St. Gallen, Switzerland
Wiesbaden Grand Prix, Wiesbaden, Germany

References

Hickstead Derby results
Aachen results

Irish show jumping horses
1966 animal births
1983 animal deaths
Individual male horses
Irish Sport Horses
Sport horse sires